Rudaeicoccus suwonensis is a Gram-positive species of bacteria from the family of Dermacoccaceae has been isolated from the roots of a Phalaenopsis orchid.

References

 

Micrococcales
Bacteria described in 2013
Monotypic bacteria genera